Tunisia sent 130 athletes to the 2009 Mediterranean Games. Tunisians competed in 17 different sporting disciplines, with 46 competing in team sports and 84 competing individually.

Medalists

References

Nations at the 2009 Mediterranean Games
2009
Mediterranean Games